Win Min Htut (born 6 April 1986) is a footballer from Myanmar. He made his first appearance for the Myanmar national football team in 2009.

References 

1986 births
Living people
Burmese footballers
Myanmar international footballers
Shan United F.C. players
Association football defenders
Southern Myanmar F.C. players